José Alfredo López (24 January 1897 – 10 March 1969) was an Argentine footballer who played his entire career for Boca Juniors, having played 94 official matches with the club between 1918 and 1921, winning six titles. His position on the field was right midfielder.

Apart from his tenure on Boca Juniors, López played in nine matches for the Argentina national team from 1918 to 1921. He was also part of Argentina's squad that won the 1921 Copa América, the first international title of Argentina.

López was also President of Boca Juniors in 1947, becoming the 20th chairman in the history of the club.

Titles

Club 
Boca Juniors
 Primera División (2): 1919, 1920
 Copa de Competencia Jockey Club (1): 1919
 Copa Ibarguren (1): 1919
 Tie Cup (1): 1919
 Copa de Honor Cousenier (1): 1920

Argentina 
 Copa América (1): 1921

References

1897 births
1969 deaths
Argentine footballers
Argentina international footballers
Place of birth missing
Association football midfielders